Bal en Blanc is a huge rave party that is hosted annually, during the Easter holiday weekend, in Montreal, Quebec, Canada. It was first held in 1995, and the first event had 800 attendees.

See also

List of electronic music festivals
List of music festivals in Canada
Black and Blue Festival

References

External links

Bal en Blanc Official Website

Music festivals established in 1995
Festivals in Montreal
Circuit parties
Tourist attractions in Montreal
Electronic music festivals in Canada
Rave
Trance festivals